The GAO Review was an American magazine published during the late 20th century.  It was published by the Government Accountability Office of the United States Congress.  It began in 1966 and ceased publication in 1987.  It was succeeded by The GAO Journal

The purpose of the Review was to cover government and defense auditing topics, document the activities of the GAO, and provide a forum for GAO employees.

Issues of the Magazine
Contents of the following issues are within the scope of the GAO web site search as of January 2009.
 Spring 1966 GAO Report #088039
 Winter 1967 GAO Report #090856
 Fall 1967 GAO Report #091197
 Winter 1968 GAO Report #091153
 Spring 1968 GAO Report #091224
 Summer 1968 GAO Report #091215
 Fall 1968 GAO Report #091196
 Winter 1969 GAO Report #091032
 Spring 1969 GAO Report #091206
 Summer 1969 GAO Report #091195
 Fall 1969 GAO Report #091194
 Winter 1970 GAO Report #091193
 Spring 1970 GAO Report #091192
 Fall 1970 GAO Report #091152
 Winter 1971 GAO Report #090868
 Spring 1971 GAO Report #091151
 Summer 1971 GAO Report #091095
 Fall 1971 GAO Report #091094
 Winter 1972 GAO Report #091031
 Spring 1972 GAO Report #090904
 Summer 1972 GAO Report #090998
 Fall 1972 GAO Report #091029
 Spring 1973 GAO Report #091089
 Summer 1973 GAO Report #090938
 Fall 1973 GAO Report #090997
 Winter 1974 GAO Report #091090
 Summer 1974 GAO Report #091091
 Fall 1974 GAO Report #091030
 Volume 10, Issue 2, Spring 1975 GAO Report #090936
 Volume 10, Issue 3, Summer 1975 GAO Report #091093
 Volume 10, Issue 4, Fall 1975 GAO Report #091092
 Volume 11, Issue 1, Winter 1976 GAO Report #090937
 Volume 11, Issue 2, Spring 1976 GAO Report #090967
 Volume 11, Issue 3, Summer 1976 GAO Report #090966
 Volume 13, Issue 2, Spring 1978 GAO Report #090935
 Volume 13, Issue 3, Summer 1978 GAO Report #090968
 Volume 13, Issue 4, Fall 1978 GAO Report #090996
 Volume 14, Issue 2, Spring 1979 GAO Report #095117
 Volume 14, Issue 3, Summer 1979 GAO Report #090849
 Volume 14, Issue 4, Fall 1979 GAO Report #110896
 Volume 15, Issue 1, Winter 1980 GAO Report #111442
 Volume 15, Issue 2, Spring 1980 GAO Report #112491
 Volume 15, Issue 4, Fall 1980 GAO Report #113808
 Volume 16, Issue 2, Spring 1981 GAO Report #115184
 Volume 16, Issue 3, Summer 1981 GAO Report #116145
 Volume 16, Issue 4, Fall 1981 GAO Report #117382
 Volume 17, Issue 2, Spring 1982 GAO Report #118590
 Volume 17, Issue 3, Summer 1982 GAO Report #119371
 Volume 17, Issue 4, Fall 1982 GAO Report #120961
 Volume 18, Issue 1, Winter 1983 GAO Report #121154
 Volume 18, Issue 2, Spring 1983 GAO Report #121705
 Volume 18, Issue 3, Summer 1983 GAO Report #124336
 Volume 18, Issue 4, Fall 1983 GAO Report #123324
 Volume 19, Issue 1, Winter 1984 GAO Report #123789
 Volume 19, Issue 2, Spring 1984 GAO Report #124062
 Volume 19, Issue 3, Summer 1984 GAO Report #124845
 Volume 19, Issue 4, Fall 1984 GAO Report #125824
 Volume 20, Issue 1, Winter 1985 GAO Report #126469
 Volume 20, Issue 2, Spring 1985 GAO Report #127079
 Volume 20, Issue 3, Summer 1985 GAO Report #127817
 Volume 20, Issue 4, Fall 1985 GAO Report #128767
 Volume 21, Issue 1, Winter 1986 GAO Report #129469
 Volume 21, Issue 2, Spring 1986 GAO Report #130321
 Volume 21, Issue 3, Summer 1986 GAO Report #131237
 Volume 21, Issue 4, Fall 1986 GAO Report #132000
 Volume 22, Issue 1, Winter 1987 GAO Report #132828

References

Quarterly magazines published in the United States
Defunct magazines published in the United States
Government Accountability Office
Magazines established in 1966
Magazines disestablished in 1987
Publications of the United States government
Magazines published in Washington, D.C.
State media